Henry Ryan (22 April 17752 September 1833) was a US-Canadian Methodist minister.

He was born in Massachusetts and died in Gainsborough, near Grimsby, Upper Canada.

References

External links
 

1775 births
1833 deaths
People of colonial Massachusetts
18th-century Canadian people
Methodist ministers